Tsit Yuen Lam (born 6 February 1942) is a Hong Kong-American mathematician specializing in algebra, especially ring theory and quadratic forms.

Academic career
Lam earned his bachelor's degree at the University of Hong Kong in 1963 and his Ph.D. at Columbia University in 1967 under Hyman Bass, with a thesis titled On Grothendieck Groups.  Subsequently, he was an instructor at the University of Chicago and since 1968 he has been at the University of California, Berkeley, where he became assistant professor in 1969, associate professor in 1972, and full professor in 1976.  He served as assistant department head several times.  From 1995 to 1997 he was Deputy Director of the Mathematical Sciences Research Institute in Berkeley, California.

Among his doctoral students is Richard Elman.

Awards and honors
From 1972 to 1974 he was a Sloan Fellow; in 1978–79 a Miller Research Professor; and in 1981–82 a Guggenheim Fellow.  In 1982 he was awarded the Leroy P. Steele Prize for his textbooks.

In 2012 he became a fellow of the American Mathematical Society.

Selected publications
 Serre’s Conjecture. Lecture Notes in Mathematics, Springer, 1978
 Serre’s Problem on Projective Modules. Springer 2006; 2nd printing, 2010
 The Algebraic Theory of Quadratic Forms. Benjamin 1973, 1980; new version published as Introduction to Quadratic Forms over Fields, American Mathematical Society, 2005
 A First Course in Non-Commutative Rings. Graduate Texts in Mathematics, Springer 1991, 2nd edition 2001, 
 Lectures on Modules and Rings. Springer, Graduate Texts in Mathematics 1999, 
 Sums of squares of real polynomials. (with Man-Duen Choi & Bruce Reznick), Proceedings of Symposia in Pure Mathematics 58, 103–126, 1995
 Orderings, Valuations and Quadratic Forms. AMS 1983
 Exercises in Classical Ring Theory. Springer 1985
 Representations of Finite Groups: A Hundred Years. Part I, Part II. Notices of the AMS 1998. (pdf files)

References

External links
 Lam's homepage

Algebraists
1942 births
Fellows of the American Mathematical Society
20th-century Hong Kong mathematicians
20th-century American mathematicians
21st-century American mathematicians
Alumni of the University of Hong Kong
Columbia University alumni
University of Chicago faculty
University of California, Berkeley College of Letters and Science faculty
Place of birth missing (living people)
Living people